Dwight St. Hillaire (born 5 December 1997) is an Olympic sprinter from Trinidad and Tobago.

From Belle Garden, he achieved success whilst attending the University of Kentucky becoming an All-American, winning silver medals at the NCAA Championships and at the SEC Championships.

In 2018 he clocked a personal best 44.55 seconds to move into sixth spot on T&T’s all-time men’s 400 metres list. In March 2021 he ran a new lifetime best of 20.25 seconds in the 200 metres at an invitational meeting in South Carolina. In April 2021 he ran 44.74 in his first outdoor 400 metres race of the year which earned him at the time second spot on the 2021 world outdoor performance list, behind American Bryce Deadmon.

Whilst running in the Athletics at the 2020 Summer Olympics – Men's 400 metres he ran a time of 45.41 to qualify from the heats to the semi finals. In the 4x400m relay final St.Hillaire injured his hamstring but determinedly finished his leg of the race.

Personal bests
Outdoor
100 metres – 10.33 (Knoxville 2018)
200 metres – 20.25 (Columbia 2021)
400 metres – 44.55 (Tampa 2018)
Indoor
60 metres – 6.76 (Lexington 2019)
200 metres – 20.73 (Clemson 2018)
400 metres – 45.64 (Clemson 2021)
1.803 metres — 2700 (Madison P 12/2020)

References

External links
  (Track & Field Results Reporting System)
 
 
 

1997 births
Living people
Trinidad and Tobago male sprinters
Athletes (track and field) at the 2019 Pan American Games
Pan American Games bronze medalists for Trinidad and Tobago
Pan American Games medalists in athletics (track and field)
Medalists at the 2019 Pan American Games
Kentucky Wildcats men's track and field athletes
Athletes (track and field) at the 2020 Summer Olympics
Olympic athletes of Trinidad and Tobago
Commonwealth Games gold medallists for Trinidad and Tobago
Commonwealth Games medallists in athletics
Athletes (track and field) at the 2022 Commonwealth Games
Medallists at the 2022 Commonwealth Games